Irish court may refer to: 

 Courts of the Republic of Ireland
 Courts of Northern Ireland
 Royal court of Ireland: see Kingdom of Ireland (1542-1800)